Karl Würbs (12 August 1807, Prague – 6 July 1876, Prague) was a Czech painter, lithographer, and art teacher.

Life and works 
He was born to a family of brushmakers and was taught the trade. However, at an early age, he displayed artistic talent, acting abilities, and an interest in literature. His career choice was determined when he befriended Karl Krumpigl (1804-1832), an aspiring landscape painter.

After leaving the Academy. he made his living as an engraver and lithographer, and contributed art criticism to the magazine, Bohemie. He later took a study trip to Germany and Austria, and spent 1839 in the Netherlands.

Upon his return, he began working for the firm of Haas & Hennig, producing lithographs of vedute and, in 1842, collaborated on a major work depicting Czech castles and chateaux. Later, he devoted himself to landscape painting, but his paintings were often criticized for what were considered to be "unnatural colors".   

He also worked as an engraving teacher at the Czech Technical University and, from 1869 to 1871, taught perspective at the Academy. In 1873, he was employed by Count Thun von Děčín as an appraiser for paintings and engravings. 

He never married, and died without descendants at the age of sixty-nine.

References

Further reading

External links 

 Works by and about Würbs @ the National Library of the Czech Republic
 Antikvariát Bastion: Karel Würbs
 Patrik Šimon Galerie: Karel Würbs

1807 births
1876 deaths
Czech painters
Czech lithographers
Landscape painters
Artists from Prague
Czech engravers